Sorry is a word commonly used in apologizing. Sorry may also refer to:

Film and television
 Sorry (2002 film), a 2002 Japanese film
 Sorry (2021 film), a 2021 comedy film
 Sorry: A Love Story, an upcoming Pakistani film
 Sorry, a 2002 skateboarding video by Flip Skateboards
 Sorry! (TV series), a 1980s British sitcom

Games
 Sorry! (game), a board game
Sorry! (video game), a 1998 game based on the board game

Literature
 Sorry (novel), a 2007 novel by Gail Jones
 Sorry, a novel by Zoran Drvenkar

Music

Performers
 Sorry (band), an English indie band
 Scott Sorry (born 1978), American singer-songwriter

Albums
 Sorry! (album) or the title song, by Catherine, 1994
 Sorry (Meg Myers album) or the title song, 2015
 Sorry (White Lung album), 2012
 Sorry, by Mai Yamane, 1981

Songs
 "Sorry" (Beyoncé song), 2016
 "Sorry" (Bic Runga song), 1999
 "Sorry" (Buckcherry song), 2007
 "Sorry" (Ciara song), 2012
 "Sorry" (Easybeats song), 1966
 "Sorry" (Grace Jones song), 1976
 "Sorry" (Halsey song), 2017
 "Sorry" (IDER song), 2016
 "Sorry" (Justin Bieber song), 2015
 "Sorry" (Madness song), 2007
 "Sorry" (Madonna song), 2006
 "Sorry" (Naya Rivera song), 2013
 "Sorry" (Nothing But Thieves song), 2017
 "Sorry" (The Paddingtons song), 2005
 "Sorry" (Rick Ross song), 2015
 "Sorry" (T.I. song), 2012
 "Sorry (I Didn't Know)", by Monsta Boy, 2000; covered by Joel Corry, 2019
 "Sorry (I Ran All the Way Home)", by the Impalas, 1959
 "Sorry", by 6lack from East Atlanta Love Letter, 2018
 "Sorry", by As It Is from Never Happy, Ever After, 2015
 "Sorry", by Ashlee Simpson from Autobiography, 2004
 "Sorry", by Beabadoobee from Fake It Flowers, 2020
 "Sorry", by Ben Adams, 2005
 "Sorry", by Cueshé from Half Empty Half Full, 2005
 "Sorry", by Daughtry from Daughtry, 2006
 "Sorry", by Demis Roussos from Man of the World, 1980
 "Sorry", by Future from Hndrxx, 2017
 "Sorry", by Gabriella Cilmi from Lessons to Be Learned, 2008
 "Sorry", by Guns N' Roses from Chinese Democracy, 2008
 "Sorry", by Jimmy Barnes from Love and Fear, 1999
 "Sorry", by Jonas Brothers from  A Little Bit Longer, 2008
 "Sorry", by Lauren Jauregui from Prelude, 2021
 "Sorry", by the Moth & The Flame from &, 2013
 "Sorry", by Mýa from K.I.S.S. (Keep It Sexy & Simple), 2011
 "Sorry", by Natalie Cole from I Love You So, 1979
 "Sorry", by Pat Benatar from Go, 2003
 "Sorry", by Sheppard from Watching the Sky, 2018
 "Sorry", by Simon Townshend from Moving Target, 1985
 "Sorry", by Sleeping with Sirens from Feel, 2013
 "Sorry", by Status Quo from Thirsty Work, 1994
 "Sorry", by Tears for Fears from Raoul and the Kings of Spain, 1995
 "Sorry", by Toni Braxton from Sex & Cigarettes , 2018
 "Sorry", by UB40 from Promises and Lies, 1993
 "Sorry", by Yo Gotti from I Am, 2013
 "Sorry", by Zion I from Deep Water Slang V2.0, 2003

See also
Apology (disambiguation)
I'm Sorry (disambiguation)
Regret (emotion)
Sorry Sorry (disambiguation)